Gun laws in Connecticut regulate the sale, possession, and use of firearms and ammunition in the U.S. state of Connecticut. Gun laws in Connecticut are amongst the most restrictive in the country. Connecticut requires training, background check and permitting requirements for the purchase of firearms and ammunition; and a ban (with exceptions) on certain semi-automatic firearms defined as "assault weapons" and magazines that can hold more than 10 rounds. Connecticut's licensing system for open and concealed carry is relatively permissive.

Summary table

State constitutional provisions
Article I, Section 15 of the Constitution of Connecticut states: "Every citizen has a right to bear arms in defense of himself and the state."

Permitting system 
Connecticut issues a Permit to Carry Pistols and Revolvers to both residents and non-residents, which allows both open and concealed carry by the permit-holder. By law, Connecticut is a May-Issue state based on an applicant's suitability to be granted a pistol permit, but court precedence has established that issuing authorities must grant permits on a Shall-Issue basis for the vast majority of applicants who meet the state's statutory qualifications. State statutes specify that the issuing authority must determine the applicant is a "suitable person" before approving the application for a pistol permit, although no such definition exists in state law. However, the state's courts have established that a "suitable person" is one who generally meets all of the statutory criteria to qualify for a state pistol permit. Additionally, unlike other May-Issue states, Connecticut law does not require the applicant to provide a "necessary and proper reason" (or in other words, show "good cause") for needing a pistol permit. As such, the state courts have generally ruled that issuing authorities cannot deny an applicant a pistol permit either arbitrarily or for reasons that are unrelated to the applicant's qualifications for obtaining such a permit. This interpretation by the courts does afford the issuing authority some degree of discretion when he or she has personal knowledge of the applicant's character that may not be reflected in any official background check, although a denial on this basis would have to be strongly justified with substantiating evidence by the issuing authority. As of the end of 2012, there were 179,092 active pistol permits in Connecticut. The number of active pistol permits has increased to more than 250,000 as of early 2016, compared to a total population of 3.5 million.  Of the more than 12,000 pistol permit applications received and processed by the Connecticut Department of Emergency Services and Public Protection (DESPP) in 2011, only 23 applicants were denied a pistol permit. Despite this, the application process for a Connecticut pistol permit can be quite lengthy depending on town, with some applicants reporting that the entire process for obtaining a pistol permit taking more than a year from the time the initial application is filed with the local issuing authority to when the Regular 5-year permit is issued by the DESPP.

Connecticut has a two-step permitting process: a 60-day Temporary permit issued by the local police chief, and a Regular 5-year permit issued by the Department of Public Safety Special Licensing and Firearms Unit (SLFU). The Temporary permit, issued by local authorities on a May-Issue basis, is a vestige of the pre-1965 pistol permitting system, when Connecticut permits were issued entirely by local authorities. The rewriting of the Connecticut State Constitution in 1965 intended to consolidate authority to issue pistol permits with the Department of Emergency Services and Public Protection (DESPP) and require permits to be issued on a Shall-Issue basis, but the transition to the uniform statewide permitting system was never fully completed, resulting in the two-step permitting system in Connecticut today.  The initial step of obtaining a Temporary permit from local authorities only applies to an initial permit application; those renewing an expiring permit submit a renewal application directly to the DESPP.

Those desiring a pistol permit in Connecticut must first apply for a temporary permit (valid for 60 days from the date of issuance) from the local police department, or in some locations the town clerk's office, which conducts the background checks and fingerprinting. Temporary permits are issued on a May-Issue basis, and each town is different in its willingness to approve permits; some towns create their own requirements that go well beyond the State requirements (although state law does not require the applicant to fulfill any locally defined requirements to qualify for a pistol permit). It is typically much more difficult to obtain temporary pistol permits in larger cities, such as Bridgeport, Hartford, and New Haven. Other towns will automatically issue a permit as long as the individual does not meet any statutory criteria that would disqualify him or her from holding such a permit. State law technically does not require an applicant for a Temporary permit to be a resident of the town in which the application is filed.  In practice, local issuing authorities will generally not accept permit applications from non-residents, although some towns will accept applications from non-residents who have a bona-fide place of business within such jurisdictions. While the town has 8 weeks per state law to approve the temporary permit, it may be several months before the local issuing authority makes a decision on a pistol permit application. If the temporary permit is granted, the applicant must apply to the SLFU for a regular pistol permit (valid for 5 years), which will generally grant the permit unless there is reason specified by law the individual should be denied. These include:

 Criminal possession of a narcotic substance;
 Criminally negligent homicide;
 Assault in the third degree;
 Reckless endangerment in the first degree;
 Unlawful restraint in the second degree;
 Riot in the first degree;
 Stalking in the second degree;
 Conviction as a delinquent for the commission of a serious juvenile offense;
 Discharge from custody within the preceding twenty (20) years after having been found not guilty of a crime by reason of mental disease or defect;
 Restraining or protective order issued by a court in a case involving the use, attempted use or threatened use of physical force against another person;
 Firearms seizure order issued for posing a risk of personal injury to self or others after a hearing; or
 The individual is explicitly prohibited from possessing a firearm for having been adjudicated as mentally incompetent under federal law.

When a temporary permit application is denied, the issuing authority must provide a detailed written explanation to the applicant as to why the application was denied. An applicant who is denied a temporary pistol permit from local authorities may appeal to the state Board of Firearms Permit Examiners (BFPE), which will generally grant the appeal and issue a Regular 5-year pistol permit, provided the applicant does not meet the statutory criteria prohibiting him or her from holding such permit. Applicants may appeal an unfavorable ruling by the BFPE through the state courts.

Connecticut residents are issued a "permit to carry pistols and revolvers", which permits both open and concealed carry, and are valid statewide. Although open carry is not restricted by state law, the BFPE suggests that, “every effort should be made to ensure that no gun is exposed to view or carried in a manner that would tend to alarm people who see it.” Residents with permits who carried openly had been investigated or cited by police for breach of peace, although state prosecutors usually dismissed such charges after the defendant appeared in court. In February 2016, the Chief State's Attorney issued a memo to police clarifying that openly carrying a holstered firearm did not, in itself, constitute a violation of the breach of peace statute. The state's attorney made a comparison to operating a motor vehicle requiring another violation to launch an investigation or require the citizen present a license/permit.

Connecticut also has a provision in the statute that if a carry permit holder loses a firearm and does not report it, they may lose the permit.

Post-Sandy Hook gun control legislation
On April 1, 2013, Connecticut lawmakers announced a deal on what they called some of the "toughest gun laws in the country." In retrospect however, Connecticut's gun laws still remain more permissive than in California, Hawaii, Maryland, Massachusetts, New York, and New Jersey (especially with respect to open and concealed carry), even after new gun control legislation following the Sandy Hook Elementary School shooting went into effect. This new legislation included a ban on new high-capacity ammunition magazines, although magazines lawfully owned prior to the ban may be kept. The proposal also called for background checks for private gun sales and a new registry for existing magazines that carry more than 10 bullets. The package also creates what state lawmakers said is the nation's first statewide dangerous weapon offender registry, immediate universal background checks for all firearms sales and expansion of Connecticut's assault weapons ban. On April 3 the State Senate, followed shortly thereafter at midnight, April 4, the State House approved a bipartisan gun control legislation that would be "the toughest in the United States". It was signed into law by Governor Dannel Malloy on April 4. The law makes Connecticut the first state to establish a registry for people convicted of crimes involving dangerous weapons. It also requires background checks for all gun sales, restricts semiautomatic rifles, and limits the capacity of ammunition magazines.

One proposed provision that ultimately did not make it into the final bill would have eliminated the state-level board for approving pistol permit applications and reverted the sole authority for approving or denying pistol permits back to local officials, who would then have wide latitude in adjudicating permit applications by requiring the applicant to show "good cause" for needing a pistol permit. This proposal would have mirrored California's May-Issue permitting system, where the ability for one to obtain a pistol permit would vary widely from town-to-town, although permits would be valid statewide. A subsequent compromise included in the law adds a mental health expert to the Board of Firearms Permit Examiners and establishes a process for local authorities to challenge the appeal of any applications denied at the local level.

Reciprocity 
Connecticut does not recognize pistol permits from any other state, but residents of other states who hold a concealed weapons permit may apply to the Department of Emergency Services and Public Protection for a non-resident Connecticut permit through the mail. Nonresident pistol permits are generally granted on a Shall-Issue basis, provided the applicant meets Connecticut's statutory requirements and completes a weapons safety course that satisfies the state's training requirement.

Assault weapons 
Connecticut has bans on defined 'assault weapons', which includes selective fire firearms unless purchased before October 1, 1993, and a limited list of semiautomatic AR, AK, and SKS variants. Magazines holding more than 10 rounds are considered Large Capacity Magazines and are prohibited, with grandfathering for those possessed prior to April 4, 2013, provided they are registered with DESPP by January 1, 2014. On April 4, 2013, Governor Malloy signed a comprehensive gun control bill that expands the scope of the assault weapon ban by reducing the number of defined features from two to one, while adding 100 specific firearms to the existing assault weapons ban list. Such weapons that were lawfully owned prior to the enactment of the law are grandfathered, but must be registered with the DESPP. Exceptions to the ban also exist for law enforcement and military members, but these weapons too must be registered.

The transfer of registered assault weapons is generally not permitted, except in cases where the original owner becomes deceased; in which case the weapon may be transferred through inheritance to a designated heir.  Additionally, registered assault weapons may be transferred to the State Police or local police department, a licensed firearms dealer, or to a recipient outside of Connecticut (assuming that federal law and the laws of the state in which the recipient is located are followed).

Connecticut allows all NFA firearms other than selective fire machine guns; however, guns of this type that existed in Connecticut before the ban are grandfathered. Selective fire means that a machine gun can fire semi or fully automatic. Machine guns that can only fire fully automatic are legal in Connecticut if they were possessed prior to April 4, 2013, and registered on or before January 1, 2014.

Firearms that meet Connecticut's assault weapon criteria that were manufactured and lawfully acquired prior to September 13, 1994, are no longer required to be registered with the DESPP and may be sold or transferred to any person who is not prohibited from owning firearms under state or federal law.

Persons moving into Connecticut with assault weapons (manufactured after September 13, 1994) must—within 90 days of arrival in the state—either surrender the weapons to the State Police or local police, transfer them to a licensed gun dealer or otherwise sell or transfer the weapons to a recipient outside of Connecticut. Such weapons may also be modified to eliminate "assault weapon" features as long as the receiver is not included on the list of specific makes and models banned by the assault weapons law.

Seizure of weapons 

Connecticut statutes allows police, after investigating and determining probable cause, to get a court warrant and seize guns from anyone posing an imminent risk of harming themselves or someone else. A judge must hold a hearing within 14 days after the seizure and order the police to hold the guns for up to one year or return them. The judge (1) must, when assessing probable cause, consider recent acts of violence, threatening, or animal cruelty and (2) may, when assessing imminent risk, consider such factors as reckless gun use or display, violent threats, alcohol abuse, illegal drug use, and prior involuntary psychiatric confinement. Connecticut's weapons seizure law does not require the individual to be compensated by authorities when weapons are permanently confiscated, as the seizure action falls within the purview of an "enforcement action", (and thus a civil forfeiture) rather than a "seizure of property for public benefit", thereby making the seizure outside of the scope of the Takings Clause of the Fifth Amendment of the United States Constitution requiring just compensation for property taken.  Currently, only three other states (California, New York and Indiana) have weapons seizure laws similar to Connecticut's.

Other laws
Connecticut law requires gun show organizers to obtain a Gun Show Permit from local authorities prior to the start of the event. Gun Show Permits are issued by the Police Chief (or Town Clerk in some locations) on a May-Issue basis.

In 2014, the Connecticut Supreme Court ruled that dirk knives and police batons are protected by the Second Amendment.

As of October 1, 2019, all manufactured guns will be required to have a serial number obtained from the Department of Emergency Services and Public Protection engraved. Plastic, undetectable guns are also banned.

As of October 1, 2019, all firearms are required to be stored securely if accessible by a minor (under 18), a resident who is ineligible to possess a firearm, or someone who poses a risk. Prior, the law only required loaded firearms to be stored securely and defined minor as anyone under 16.

State preemption of local laws 

State laws do not explicitly preempt local ordinances, but courts have found intent of preemption in regards to firearm sales, hunting and carrying (openly or concealed) with a state-issued permit. Most municipalities have enacted ordinances to restrict or ban the discharge of firearms within their jurisdictions.

See also 
An Act Concerning Gun Violence Prevention and Children's Safety

References

External links 
 

Connecticut law
Connecticut
Gun politics in the United States